Sredorek is a Roma neighborhood in Kumanovo, North Macedonia. The population is about 3500. Most of the Roma inhabitants of the neighborhood are Sunni Muslims, there was an unsuccessful attempt of building a mosque.

References

External links
Roma in the Sredorek Settlement by Martin Demirovski (English)

Kumanovo
Neighbourhoods in North Macedonia